Theodahad, also known as Thiudahad (480 – December 536) was king of the Ostrogoths from 534 to 536.

Early life 
Born at in Tauresium, Theodahad was a nephew of Theodoric the Great through his mother Amalafrida. He is probably the son of Amalafrida's first husband because her second marriage was about 500 AD. His sister was Amalaberga. His father's identity remains unknown.

He may have arrived in Italy with Theodoric and was elderly at the time of his accession. Massimiliano Vitiello states the name "Theodahad" is a compound of  'people' and 'conflict'.

Before becoming king, his kinswoman Amalaswintha ruled. During her rule, potential enemies were murdered or humiliated. Theodahad was accused of land grabbing and forced to return land he had supposedly stolen. Letters written in the name of King Theodoric to Theodahad imply that the land was taken by force.

King 
After the death of Theodahad's nephew Athalaric, the queen regent Amalaswintha chose to associate Theodahad with her in the monarchy. This was likely to help legitimize her rulership, as the Goths were skeptical about a female ruler. Theodahad's previous conflicts with his cousin did not take long to resurface and he arrested her while they co-ruled as queen and king, imprisoning her in the spring of 535 on an island in Lake Bolsena. When Amalaswintha was assassinated while in custody, his enemies claimed he acquiesced to her murder. Since her assassination would likely separate him from her power base, this was unlikely.  

Political instability within the kingdom served as a pretext for Byzantine general Belisarius to intervene in Sicily and Italy, in the service of Emperor Justinian, causing the Gothic Wars.

When his ineffectiveness in the war caused Theodahad to lose control, Witiges sent Optaris to retrieve him dead or alive. Optaris murdered Theodahad after overtaking him on the Via Flaminia. According to Procopius, Theodahad's throat was cut. When Optaris returned with news of the former king's death, the Goths elected Witigis as their king.

He was notable for his adoration for Neoplatonic philosophy and poetry over martial prowess. His focus on erudition instead of bellicosity, in a time when Italy was consumed by turmoil, is claimed to be a reason for his downfall.

In fiction
Theodahad makes an appearance in Felix Dahn's 1876 historical novel Ein Kampf um Rom, which appeared in English translation in 1878 as A Struggle for Rome. In the book he is depicted as weak and subservient to his wife, Gothelinda, who is portrayed as the true culprit behind Amalaswintha's murder.

Theodahad also appears (as "Thiudahad") as a character in L. Sprague de Camp's 1939 alternate history novel Lest Darkness Fall.

References

External links
 Theodahad in Medieval Lands

480s births
536 deaths
6th-century kings of Italy
Ostrogothic kings
Amali dynasty
Assassinated Gothic people
6th-century murdered monarchs
6th-century monarchs in Europe
People of the Gothic War (535–554)
Year of birth unknown
6th-century Ostrogothic people